Mark Gravett (11 February 1865 – 8 February 1938) was an English first-class cricketer. A slow left-arm orthodox bowler, he represented Hampshire in four first-class matches. Gravett made his debut in the 1899 County Championship, playing a single match against Essex.

In 1900 Gravett played a further three Championship matches, the last of which came against local rivals Sussex at the County Ground, Southampton. Aftet this match Gravett never played first-class cricket again.

In Gravett's four matches he took 15 wickets with his slow left-arm orthodox bowling, at an average of 29.66, with one five wicket haul which yielded him best figures of 5/50.

In 1921 aged 56 he took 10/21 for Milford v Haslemere Comrades 

Gravett died in Godalming, Surrey on 8 February 1938.

References

External links
Mark Gravett at Cricinfo
Mark Gravett at CricketArchive

1865 births
1938 deaths
People from the Borough of Waverley
English cricketers
Hampshire cricketers